The 1985 USFL Draft was the third Collegiate Draft of the United States Football League (USFL). It took place on January 3, 1985, at the Grand Hyatt Hotel in New York.

Player selections

References

External links
 1985 USFL Draft
 1985 USFL Draft Pick Transactions

United States Football League drafts
USFL Draft
USFL Draft
1980s in Manhattan
American football in New York City
Sports in Manhattan
Sporting events in New York City
USFL Draft